Candice Marie Bennatt (born 1989) is an American lawyer and beauty pageant titleholder who was crowned Miss New Mexico 2012 and represented New Mexico at Miss America 2013 but did not place. She was crowned Miss Louisiana USA 2015 and then represented Louisiana at Miss USA 2015 where she placed Top 11.

Early life
Bennatt was born in 1989 in Houston to an Italian father and a Puerto Rican mother and raised in the neighborhood of Kingwood. She has been a cheerleader for the Houston Texans. She graduated from Kingwood High School and earned a bachelor's degree in biology with a minor in communications from Sam Houston State University; she is a graduate of Loyola University New Orleans with a degree in law and now runs a family law practice in Metairie, La.

Prior to the Miss USA pageant she was a promotional model and a past finalist in the Miss Darque Tan 2010 Model Search, and a past contestant with Bikini USA (2009). She was a past model with the Texas Bikini Team during the 2009/2010 season (appearing in the calendar and poster), and a past contestant for the Swimsuit USA Model Search in 2011 (placed in the first preliminary but withdrew from the state finals). As of 2015 she has disowned her past association with the promotional modeling she has done in the Houston, TX area.

Pageantry

Early pageantry
Bennatt became Miss Albuquerque Outstanding Teen while in high school.  She won Miss Dallas in November 2011 and competed in Miss Texas and placed 4th runner-up.  She also won both the Preliminary Swimwear and Overall Swimwear competitions.

Miss America 2013
Bennatt won Miss New Mexico in June 2012, after which she competed in Miss America 2013.

Miss USA 2015
In October 2014 she was crowned Miss Louisiana USA 2015 and represented Louisiana at Miss USA 2015 where she competed to succeed the current titleholder, Nia Sanchez of Nevada, eventually finishing in the Top 11.

References

Living people
People from New Orleans
Sam Houston State University alumni
Loyola University New Orleans College of Law alumni
Miss USA 2015 delegates
American people of Italian descent
American people of Puerto Rican descent
1989 births
People from Kingwood, Texas
Lawyers from Houston